The 1994 NASCAR Winston Cup Series was the 46th season of NASCAR professional stock car racing in the United States and the 23rd modern-era Cup series. The season began on Sunday, February 20, and ended on Sunday, November 13. Dale Earnhardt of Richard Childress Racing was crowned champion at season's end, winning consecutive Winston Cups for the third time in his career and tying Richard Petty for the record of most top-level NASCAR championships with seven. It was also the 7th and final NASCAR Winston Cup Series Championship for Dale Earnhardt before his death 7 years later in 2001; this was also the final season for 18-time Winston Cup winner Harry Gant.

One of the highlights of the season occurred on August 6, when the NASCAR Winston Cup Series made a highly publicized first visit to the Indianapolis Motor Speedway for the inaugural Brickyard 400. This season also marked the end of the second of two tire wars, as Hoosier left NASCAR after the season-ending Atlanta race, leaving Goodyear as the series' exclusive tire distributor.

The season was marred with tragedy, as Neil Bonnett and Rodney Orr were killed in separate practice crashes prior to the Daytona 500.

Teams and drivers

Complete schedule

Limited schedule

Schedule

Races

Busch Clash 

The Busch Clash was held February 13 at Daytona International Speedway. Ken Schrader drew for the pole.

 24-Jeff Gordon
 26-Brett Bodine
 3-Dale Earnhardt
 28-Ernie Irvan
 6-Mark Martin
 42-Kyle Petty
 11-Bill Elliott
 25-Ken Schrader
 2-Rusty Wallace
 33-Harry Gant

Two days earlier, during practice, Neil Bonnett died of massive head injuries after his car had a tire failure in turn 3 and hit the wall head-on.
The day after this race, Rodney Orr died of massive head and chest injuries after his car lifted at over 175 mph and slammed into the outside retaining wall and catch fence, with the caution light piercing through the roof.

Gatorade 125s 

The Gatorade 125s, the qualifying races for the Daytona 500, were held February 19 at Daytona International Speedway.

Race one: top ten results

 28-Ernie Irvan
 2-Rusty Wallace
 6-Mark Martin
 5-Terry Labonte
 75-Todd Bodine
 25-Ken Schrader
 14-John Andretti
 97-Chad Little
 54-Robert Pressley
 27-Jimmy Spencer

Race two: top ten results

 3-Dale Earnhardt
 4-Sterling Marlin
 24-Jeff Gordon
 11-Bill Elliott
 26-Brett Bodine
 21-Morgan Shepherd
 30-Michael Waltrip
 98-Derrike Cope
 43-Wally Dallenbach Jr.
 10-Ricky Rudd

Daytona 500 

The Daytona 500 was held in Daytona International Speedway. Loy Allen Jr. won the pole.

Top ten results

 4-Sterling Marlin
 28-Ernie Irvan
 5-Terry Labonte
 24-Jeff Gordon
 21-Morgan Shepherd
 77-Greg Sacks
 3-Dale Earnhardt
 10-Ricky Rudd
 11-Bill Elliott
 25-Ken Schrader

Sterling Marlin becomes the 5th driver to score his first career win in the Daytona 500.
First career win in 279 starts for Sterling Marlin after finishing 2nd 8 times, tying Bill Elliott for most 2nd-place finishes before 1st career win.
This was the first points Cup race when cars were mandated to have roof flaps after Rusty Wallace had violently flipped at both Daytona & Talladega in 1993.

Goodwrench 500 

The Goodwrench 500 was held February 27 at North Carolina Speedway. The No. 7 of Geoff Bodine was on the pole.

Top ten results

 2-Rusty Wallace
 4-Sterling Marlin
 1-Rick Mast
 6-Mark Martin, 1 lap down
 28-Ernie Irvan, 1 lap down
 26-Brett Bodine, 1 lap down
 3-Dale Earnhardt, 1 lap down
 42-Kyle Petty, 2 laps down
 25-Ken Schrader, 3 laps down
 30-Michael Waltrip, 3 laps down

Failed to qualify: 31-Ward Burton, 48-James Hylton, 99-Danny Sullivan, 61-Rick Carelli, 95-Jeremy Mayfield, 48-Jerry Hill, 02-T. W. Taylor

Jerry Hill may have made a second attempt for James Hylton's entry.

Pontiac Excitement 400 

The Pontiac Excitement 400 was held March 6 at Richmond International Raceway. The No. 16 of Ted Musgrave won the pole.

Top ten results

 28-Ernie Irvan
 2-Rusty Wallace
 24-Jeff Gordon
 3-Dale Earnhardt
 42-Kyle Petty
 6-Mark Martin
 1-Rick Mast
 26-Brett Bodine
 5-Terry Labonte*
 18-Dale Jarrett, 1 lap down

Failed to qualify: 19-Loy Allen Jr., 45-Rich Bickle, 71-Dave Marcis, 43-Wally Dallenbach Jr., 23-Hut Stricklin, 47-Billy Standridge, 61-Rick Carelli, 02-T. W. Taylor, ??-Mike Wallace

Dave Marcis served as a broadcaster for TBS Sports after failing to qualify.
Terry Labonte started 37th (last) as he withdrew his time & took a champions provisional to allow Ricky Rudd to qualify on his time as Rudd's time would not have been fast enough and his new team had no owners points from the previous season and he would not have been eligible for a provisional. Rudd would finish 2 laps down in 18th.

Purolator 500 

The Purolator 500 was held March 13 at Atlanta Motor Speedway. The No. 19 of Loy Allen Jr. won the pole after failing to qualify at the previous race.

Top ten results

 28-Ernie Irvan
 21-Morgan Shepherd
 17-Darrell Waltrip
 8-Jeff Burton
 6-Mark Martin, 1 lap down
 15-Lake Speed, 1 lap down
 77-Greg Sacks, 1 lap down
 24-Jeff Gordon, 2 laps down
 10-Ricky Rudd, 2 laps down
 27-Jimmy Spencer, 2 laps down

Failed to qualify: 43-Wally Dallenbach Jr., 20-Buddy Baker, 61-Rick Carelli, 47-Billy Standridge, 89-Jim Sauter, 80-Jimmy Horton, 99-Danny Sullivan, 95-Jeremy Mayfield
First career top 5 for Jeff Burton.
Final time in his career that Ernie Irvan would win back-to-back races.

TranSouth Financial 400 

The TranSouth Financial 400 was held March 27 at Darlington Raceway. Bill Elliott won the pole.

Top ten results

 3-Dale Earnhardt
 6-Mark Martin
 11-Bill Elliott
 18-Dale Jarrett
 15-Lake Speed
 28-Ernie Irvan
 25-Ken Schrader
 33-Harry Gant, 1 lap down
 10-Ricky Rudd, 1 lap down
 16-Ted Musgrave, 1 lap down

Failed to qualify:  19-Loy Allen Jr., 61-Rick Carelli, 47-Billy Standridge, 02-Curtis Markham, 57-Bob Schacht, 84-Norm Benning, 36-H. B. Bailey, 59-Andy Belmont

Food City 500 

The Food City 500 was held April 10 at Bristol International Raceway. The No. 12 of Chuck Bown won the pole.

Top ten results

 3-Dale Earnhardt
 25-Ken Schrader
 15-Lake Speed
 7-Geoff Bodine, 1 lap down
 30-Michael Waltrip, 3 laps down
 22-Bobby Labonte, 4 laps down
 2-Rusty Wallace, 6 laps down
 4-Sterling Marlin, 9 laps down
 40-Bobby Hamilton, 12 laps down
 71-Dave Marcis*, 14 laps down

Failed to qualify (or "Watching on TV" as said on ESPN): 14-John Andretti, 55-Jimmy Hensley, 19-Loy Allen Jr., 95-Jeremy Mayfield, 52-Brad Teague

Several accidents (including one during green flag pit stops) caused the big gaps among the top ten cars.
Dave Marcis' final Top 10 finish.
Final time in his career that Dale Earnhardt would win back-to-back races.

First Union 400 

The First Union 400 was held April 17 at North Wilkesboro Speedway. Ernie Irvan won the pole.

Top ten results

 5-Terry Labonte
 2-Rusty Wallace
 28-Ernie Irvan
 42-Kyle Petty
 3-Dale Earnhardt
 10-Ricky Rudd
 7-Geoff Bodine, 1 lap down
 33-Harry Gant, 1 lap down
 25-Ken Schrader, 2 laps down
 1-Rick Mast, 3 laps down

Failed to qualify (or "Seeing Granny" as said on ESPN): 29-Steve Grissom, 31-Ward Burton, 9-Rich Bickle, 41-Joe Nemechek, 19-Loy Allen Jr., 55-Jimmy Hensley, 90-Mike Wallace, 02-Curtis Markham, 52-Mike Skinner, 62-Freddie Query

This was Terry Labonte's first win since the 1989 Talladega DieHard 500 and his 1st victory for Hendrick Motorsports.

Hanes 500 

The Hanes 500 was held April 24 at Martinsville Speedway. Rusty Wallace won the pole.

Top ten results

 2-Rusty Wallace
 28-Ernie Irvan
 6-Mark Martin
 17-Darrell Waltrip
 21-Morgan Shepherd
 75-Todd Bodine
 12-Chuck Bown
 1-Rick Mast, 1 lap down
 11-Bill Elliott, 1 lap down
 16-Ted Musgrave, 1 lap down

Failed to qualify (or "Gone hunting" on ESPN): 43-Wally Dallenbach Jr., 90-Mike Wallace, 71-Dave Marcis, 19-Loy Allen Jr., 02-Curtis Markham, 89-Jim Bown, 52-Mike Skinner, 33-Harry Gant

This would be the last race Harry Gant would ever fail to qualify for.

Winston Select 500 

The Winston Select 500 was held May 1 at Talladega Superspeedway. Ernie Irvan won the pole.

Top ten results
 3-Dale Earnhardt
 28-Ernie Irvan
 30-Michael Waltrip
 27-Jimmy Spencer
 25-Ken Schrader
 77-Greg Sacks
 15-Lake Speed
 4-Sterling Marlin
 21-Morgan Shepherd
 29-Steve Grissom

Failed to qualify (or "Flipping burgers" on ESPN): 31-Ward Burton, 9-Rich Bickle, 80-Jimmy Horton, 89-Jim Sauter, 0-Delma Cowart, 53-Ritchie Petty, 02-Ronnie Sanders

During the race, a scary crash occurred just after halfway when Mark Martin's #6 car, without brakes, hit the inside retaining wall and crashed through two guardrails, through a catchfence and into a third guardrail. He was only slightly injured.
After the race, Earnhardt dedicated his win to fallen Formula One driver Ayrton Senna, who died earlier in the day at the San Marino Grand Prix.

Save Mart Supermarkets 300 

The Save Mart Supermarkets 300 was held May 15 at Sears Point Raceway. Ernie Irvan won the pole. 

Top ten results

 28-Ernie Irvan
 7-Geoff Bodine
 3-Dale Earnhardt
 43-Wally Dallenbach Jr.
 2-Rusty Wallace
 16-Ted Musgrave
 21-Morgan Shepherd
 6-Mark Martin
 25-Ken Schrader
 33-Harry Gant

Failed to qualify (or "Crushin' grapes", as referred to on ESPN): 52-Scott Gaylord, 55-Jimmy Hensley, 32-Dick Trickle, 48w-Jack Sellers, 19-Loy Allen Jr., 86w-Rich Woodland Jr.

The race was marred by a violent crash between Derrike Cope and John Krebs in which Krebs' #9 car went up and over an embankment and flipped over several times.

Coca-Cola 600 

The Coca-Cola 600 was held May 29 at Charlotte Motor Speedway. Jeff Gordon won the pole.

Top ten results

 24-Jeff Gordon
 2-Rusty Wallace
 7-Geoff Bodine
 18-Dale Jarrett
 28-Ernie Irvan
 10-Ricky Rudd
 33-Harry Gant, 1 lap down
 75-Todd Bodine, 2 laps down
 3-Dale Earnhardt, 3 laps down
 30-Michael Waltrip, 3 laps down

Failed to qualify: 55-Jimmy Hensley, 71-Dave Marcis, 44-Bobby Hillin Jr., 89-Jim Sauter

This was Jeff Gordon's first Winston Cup victory. The 22-year-old driver benefited from all the wrecks that day to score his first win. The rising young star cried in Victory Lane.
John Andretti, who finished 10th in the Indianapolis 500 earlier that day, finished the 600 in 36th. He became the first driver to run both races in the same day.

Budweiser 500 

The Budweiser 500 was held June 5 at Dover Downs International Speedway. Ernie Irvan won the pole.

Top ten results

 2-Rusty Wallace
 28-Ernie Irvan
 25-Ken Schrader
 6-Mark Martin
 24-Jeff Gordon
 17-Darrell Waltrip, 1 lap down
 30-Michael Waltrip, 1 lap down
 4-Sterling Marlin, 2 laps down
 23-Hut Stricklin, 2 laps down
 43-Wally Dallenbach Jr., 3 laps down

Failed to qualify: 84-Norm Benning, 59-Andy Belmont

UAW-GM Teamwork 500 

The UAW-GM Teamwork 500 was held June 12 at Pocono Raceway. Rusty Wallace won the pole.

Top ten results

 2-Rusty Wallace
 3-Dale Earnhardt
 25-Ken Schrader
 21-Morgan Shepherd
 6-Mark Martin
 24-Jeff Gordon
 28-Ernie Irvan
 26-Brett Bodine
 1-Rick Mast
 11-Bill Elliott

Failed to qualify: 47-Billy Standridge, 59-Andy Belmont

On lap 58 Chuck Bown was injured in a crash with Sterling Marlin and was out for the season.
This race would be the only Cup Series start for Bob Keselowski, driving the #52 Ford Thunderbird. Keselowski, father of 2012 champion Brad, would finish 41st after blowing an engine just 17 laps in.

Miller Genuine Draft 400 

The Miller Genuine Draft 400 was held June 19 at Michigan International Speedway. The No. 19 of Loy Allen Jr. was on the pole.

Top ten results

 2-Rusty Wallace
 3-Dale Earnhardt
 6-Mark Martin
 10-Ricky Rudd
 21-Morgan Shepherd
 25-Ken Schrader
 41-Joe Nemechek
 30-Michael Waltrip
 16-Ted Musgrave
 17-Darrell Waltrip

Failed to qualify: 71-Dave Marcis, 90-Mike Wallace, 80-Jimmy Horton, 52-Brad Teague,
34-Bob Brevak, 47-Billy Standridge, 32-Dick Trickle, 36-H. B. Bailey, 61-Rick Carelli, 43-Wally Dallenbach Jr.

3rd consecutive victory for Rusty Wallace.
As of 2021, Rusty Wallace is the last driver to score 3 consecutive victories in back-to-back seasons. His 3 straight wins in 1993 were at Bristol, North Wilkesboro, and Martinsville. His 3 straight wins in 1994 were at Dover, Pocono, Michigan. Rusty Wallace is also the only driver to score 3 consecutive victories in back-to-back seasons driving for different manufacturers. Wallace drove a Pontiac to his 3 straight wins in 1993, and he drove a Ford Thunderbird to his 3 straight wins in 1994.
Tim Steele replaced the injured Chuck Bown in the No. 12 for Bobby Allison Motorsports. However he would fall out of the race after completing 61 of 200 laps due to a crash and finished 39th.

Pepsi 400 

The Pepsi 400 was held July 2 at Daytona International Speedway. Dale Earnhardt won the pole.

Top ten results

 27-Jimmy Spencer
 28-Ernie Irvan
 3-Dale Earnhardt
 6-Mark Martin
 25-Ken Schrader
 7-Geoff Bodine
 75-Todd Bodine
 24-Jeff Gordon
 21-Morgan Shepherd
 15-Lake Speed

Failed to qualify ("Flippin' burgers" as on ESPN): 52-Brad Teague, 20-Bobby Hillin Jr., 80-Joe Ruttman, 43-Wally Dallenbach Jr., 47-Billy Standridge, 0-Delma Cowart

Jimmy Spencer passed Ernie Irvan on the last lap (the only lap he led) to score his first Winston Cup win.

Slick 50 300 

The Slick 50 300 was held July 10 at New Hampshire International Speedway. The No. 28 of Ernie Irvan was on the pole.

Top ten results

 10-Ricky Rudd
 3-Dale Earnhardt
 2-Rusty Wallace
 6-Mark Martin
 75-Todd Bodine
 21-Morgan Shepherd
 16-Ted Musgrave
 42-Kyle Petty
 1-Rick Mast
 4-Sterling Marlin

Failed to qualify: 19-Loy Allen Jr., 43-Wally Dallenbach Jr., 54-Robert Pressley, 62-Joe Bessey, 38-Jamie Aube

Ricky Rudd scored the first win for his own team, Rudd Performance Motorsports.

Miller Genuine Draft 500 

The Miller Genuine Draft 500 was held July 17 at Pocono Raceway. Geoff Bodine won the pole.

Top ten results

 7-Geoff Bodine
 31-Ward Burton
 41-Joe Nemechek
 8-Jeff Burton
 21-Morgan Shepherd
 10-Ricky Rudd
 3-Dale Earnhardt
 24-Jeff Gordon, 1 lap down
 2-Rusty Wallace, 1 lap down
 18-Dale Jarrett, 1 lap down

Failed to qualify: 55-Jimmy Hensley, 32-Dick Trickle, 99-Phil Parsons, 65-Jerry O'Neil

This was Geoff Bodine's 1st points race victory as an owner/driver. He had won The Winston Select non-points race back in May.
This race was held the same day as the 1994 FIFA World Cup Final in Pasadena, United States.

DieHard 500 

The DieHard 500 was held July 24 at Talladega Superspeedway. The No. 3 of Dale Earnhardt won the pole.

Top ten results

 27-Jimmy Spencer
 11-Bill Elliott
 28-Ernie Irvan
 25-Ken Schrader
 4-Sterling Marlin
 6-Mark Martin
 10-Ricky Rudd
 43-Wally Dallenbach Jr.
 44-Kenny Wallace
 5-Terry Labonte

Failed to qualify: 45-Rich Bickle, 32-Dick Trickle, 53-Ritchie Petty, 02-Derrike Cope, 31-Ward Burton, 95-Ben Hess, 47-Billy Standridge, 80-Joe Ruttman, 0-Delma Cowart, 89-Ronnie Sanders

 Buzz Aldrin, one of the first humans to walk on the moon, served as the grand marshal for this race; held 4 days after the 25th anniversary of the Apollo 11 mission. Instead of the traditional command to start engines, he said "Drivers, energize your groundcraft."
 Final Career Win for Jimmy Spencer.
 Spencer's victory would also be the last for a car with primary sponsorship from McDonald's until the 2021 YellaWood 500 race, also at Talladega, when Bubba Wallace drove the McDonald's-sponsored #23 Toyota Camry to his first career victory.

Brickyard 400 

The Inaugural Brickyard 400 was held August 6 at Indianapolis Motor Speedway. Rick Mast won the pole.

Top ten results
 24-Jeff Gordon
 26-Brett Bodine*
 11-Bill Elliott
 2-Rusty Wallace
 3-Dale Earnhardt
 17-Darrell Waltrip
 25-Ken Schrader
 30-Michael Waltrip
 75-Todd Bodine
 21-Morgan Shepherd

Ernie Irvan was holding off Jeff Gordon up until 5 to go when his right front tire cut down and Gordon took the lead; Irvan would finish 1 lap down in 17th as a result.
Brett Bodine caused controversy on lap 101 when he spun out his older brother Geoff, who seemingly made the winning pass on Brett. After being released from the infield hospital, Geoff responded to the accident by publicly announcing that he and Brett were feuding behind-the-scenes. This was a feud that lasted for several years, ending with both brothers reconciling in the late-1990's (with Geoff joining Brett's team).
"Years from today, when 79 stock car races have been run here, we'll remember the name Jeff Gordon, winner of the inaugural Brickyard 400!" - Bob Jenkins as Jeff Gordon crossed the start/finish line to win the race
Jimmy Spencer was injured in a crash that relegated him to last place (forty third) and was forced to miss the next race.

The Bud at The Glen 

The Bud at The Glen was held August 14 at Watkins Glen International. Mark Martin won the pole.

Top ten results

 6-Mark Martin
 28-Ernie Irvan
 3-Dale Earnhardt
 25-Ken Schrader
 10-Ricky Rudd
 5-Terry Labonte
 17-Darrell Waltrip
 41-Joe Nemechek
 24-Jeff Gordon
 33-Harry Gant

Failed to qualify: 00-Scott Gaylord, 19-Loy Allen Jr., 98-Jeremy Mayfield, 90-Mike Wallace, 50-Brian Bonner

Derrike Cope made his debut in the No. 12 Ford after Tim Steele was fired after failing to qualify (by quite a lot of time) for the previous Saturday's Brickyard 400.
Unbeknownst to all, this would be Ernie Irvan's last race until late 1995.
This was Harry Gant's final top ten on a road course.
Tommy Kendall substituted for an injured Jimmy Spencer for this race. He finished in 22nd, 2 laps down to the winner

GM Goodwrench Dealer 400 

The GM Goodwrench Dealer 400 was held August 21 at Michigan International Speedway. Geoff Bodine won the pole.

Top ten results

 7-Geoff Bodine
 6-Mark Martin
 1-Rick Mast
 2-Rusty Wallace
 22-Bobby Labonte
 42-Kyle Petty
 11-Bill Elliott, 1 lap down
 5-Terry Labonte, 1 lap down
 17-Darrell Waltrip, 1 lap down
 10-Ricky Rudd, 1 lap down

Failed to qualify: 40-Bobby Hamilton, 23-Hut Stricklin, 55-Jimmy Hensley, 54-Robert Pressley, 59-Andy Belmont, 82-Laura Lane, 52-Brad Teague, 34-Bob Brevak

During the weekend for this race, Ernie Irvan wrecked his No. 28 in Turn 2 for a practice run, and suffered near-fatal head, chest, and lung injuries. The team withdrew from the race.

Jimmy Spencer returned from injury and finished in 20th, 3 laps down to the winner .

Other changes included John Andretti replacing Wally Dallenbach Jr. in the No. 43 Pontiac at Petty Enterprises and starting on the front row for the first time since Richard Petty did in 1992 at Daytona. John would finish seventeenth, two laps down to the winner.

Goody's 500 

The Goody's 500 was held August 27 at Bristol International Raceway. Harry Gant won the final pole of his career.

Top ten results

 2-Rusty Wallace
 6-Mark Martin
 3-Dale Earnhardt
 17-Darrell Waltrip
 11-Bill Elliott
 4-Sterling Marlin
 30-Michael Waltrip
 75-Todd Bodine
 33-Harry Gant, 1 lap down
 1-Rick Mast, 1 lap down

Failed to qualify: 95-Jeff Green, 27-Jimmy Spencer, 71-Dave Marcis, 19-Loy Allen Jr., 55-Jimmy Hensley, 14-Phil Parsons

Kenny Wallace began his duties driving in substitution for the injured Ernie Irvan, a role that lasted the rest of the season. He would finish the race in 13th, 1 lap down to the winner.

Mountain Dew Southern 500 

The Mountain Dew Southern 500 was held on September 4 at Darlington Raceway. The No. 7 of Geoff Bodine won the pole.

Top ten results

 11-Bill Elliott
 3-Dale Earnhardt
 21-Morgan Shepherd
 10-Ricky Rudd
 4-Sterling Marlin
 24-Jeff Gordon, 1 lap down
 2-Rusty Wallace, 1 lap down
 8-Jeff Burton, 1 lap down
 18-Dale Jarrett, 2 laps down
 5-Terry Labonte, 2 laps down

Failed to qualify: 61-Rick Carelli, 57-Bob Schacht

Final win for Junior Johnson's legendary race team.
40th career Winston Cup Series win for Bill Elliott. This would be Bill's first win since the season finale at Atlanta in November 1992, breaking a 53 race winless streak. This would also be Bill's last win until November 2001 at Homestead, 7 years, and 226 races later. As of 2020, the 226 race winless streak is the longest drought in NASCAR history.

Miller Genuine Draft 400 

The Miller Genuine Draft 400 was held September 10 at Richmond International Raceway. The No. 16 of Ted Musgrave won the pole.

Top ten results

 5-Terry Labonte
 24-Jeff Gordon
 3-Dale Earnhardt
 2-Rusty Wallace
 10-Ricky Rudd
 6-Mark Martin
 29-Steve Grissom
 26-Brett Bodine, 1 lap down
 25-Ken Schrader, 1 lap down
 17-Darrell Waltrip, 1 lap down

Failed to qualify: 47-Billy Standridge, 51-Dirk Stephens, 80-Joe Ruttman, 9-Phil Parsons, 52-Brad Teague, 01-Billy Ogle, Jr., 8-Jeff Burton

Jeff Burton's time was disallowed after his car failed post-qualifying inspection.

SplitFire Spark Plug 500 

The SplitFire Spark Plug 500 was held September 18 at Dover Downs International Speedway. Geoff Bodine won the pole.

Top ten results

 2-Rusty Wallace
 3-Dale Earnhardt
 17-Darrell Waltrip
 25-Ken Schrader
 7-Geoff Bodine
 42-Kyle Petty
 5-Terry Labonte
 29-Steve Grissom, 1 lap down
 15-Lake Speed, 1 lap down
 21-Morgan Shepherd, 1 lap down

Failed to qualify: 84-Norm Benning, 79-Doug French, 47-Billy Standridge

Mark Martin was leading with 6 laps to go when he tangled with the lapped car of Ricky Rudd. Rusty Wallace assumed the lead and soon had a blown tire (possibly by running over debris). The race finished under caution and Wallace kept the lead.

This was the final race at Dover on pavement. Beginning with the spring race in 1995 the surface would be concrete.

Goody's 500 

The Goody's 500 was held September 25 at Martinsville Speedway. Ted Musgrave won the pole.

Top ten results

 2-Rusty Wallace
 3-Dale Earnhardt
 11-Bill Elliott
 28-Kenny Wallace
 18-Dale Jarrett
 25-Ken Schrader
 4-Sterling Marlin, 1 lap down
 33-Harry Gant, 1 lap down
 16-Ted Musgrave, 1 lap down
 17-Darrell Waltrip, 1 lap down

Failed to qualify: 71-Dave Marcis, 20-Bobby Hillin Jr., 19-Loy Allen Jr., 55-Tim Fedewa, 98-Jeremy Mayfield

8th and final win of 1994 for Rusty Wallace. This marked back-to-back seasons for Rusty Wallace winning the most races in a season (winning 10 races in 1993), but unfortunately, even though he scored most wins in back-to-back seasons, a major lack of consistency in both years kept him from winning back-to-back Winston Cup Championships.
This would be the 2nd time in his career that Rusty Wallace scored the most victories in back-to-back seasons. He scored 10 wins in 1993, and 8 wins in 1994. The 1st time he did this, he won the most races in 1988 and 1989, scoring 6 wins each. However, Rusty shared that feat in 1988 with that season's champion Bill Elliott, and he also shared that feat in 1989 with Darrell Waltrip, and as a bonus for 1989, Rusty won the championship that year.
This would be the final time that Rusty Wallace scored the most victories in a single season.
Last career Top 10 for Harry Gant.

Tyson Holly Farms 400 

The Tyson Holly Farms 400 was held October 2 at North Wilkesboro Speedway. The No. 27 of Jimmy Spencer won his first career Winston Cup pole.

Top ten results

 7-Geoff Bodine
 5-Terry Labonte, 1 lap down
 1-Rick Mast, 1 lap down
 2-Rusty Wallace, 1 lap down
 6-Mark Martin, 2 laps down
 11-Bill Elliott, 2 laps down
 3-Dale Earnhardt, 2 laps down
 24-Jeff Gordon, 2 laps down
 16-Ted Musgrave, 3 laps down
 28-Kenny Wallace, 3 laps down

Failed to qualify: 90-Mike Wallace, 19-Loy Allen Jr., 55-Tim Fedewa, 52-Brad Teague, 18-Dale Jarrett, 75-Todd Bodine

This is the last time that a driver won a Winston Cup race by a lap or more.

Mello Yello 500 

The Mello Yello 500 was held October 9 at Charlotte Motor Speedway. The No. 31 of Ward Burton won the pole.

Top ten results

 18-Dale Jarrett
 21-Morgan Shepherd
 3-Dale Earnhardt
 25-Ken Schrader
 15-Lake Speed
 26-Brett Bodine
 5-Terry Labonte
 12-Derrike Cope
 17-Darrell Waltrip
 30-Michael Waltrip, 1 lap down, accident*

Failed to qualify: 71-Dave Marcis, 9-Phil Parsons, 67-Ken Bouchard, 55-Butch Miller, 02-Brad Noffsinger, 52-Brad Teague, 78-Pancho Carter, 53-Kirk Shelmerdine, 84-Norm Benning, 95-Ben Hess, 45-Rich Bickle, 0-Delma Cowart

Dale Jarrett won after failing to qualify for the previous race at North Wilkesboro. This would be the first time that a driver failed to qualify for a race and then go on to win the next race.
Former NASCAR Winston Cup champion Cale Yarborough served as a commentator for TBS.
On the final lap of the race, Michael Waltrip, Darrell Waltrip, and Bobby Hillin Jr. crashed, Darrell was the only driver of the 3 to finish the last lap. Hillin finished 15th, 3 laps down to the winner

AC Delco 500 

The AC Delco 500 was held October 23 at North Carolina Speedway. Ricky Rudd won the pole.

Top ten results

 3-Dale Earnhardt
 1-Rick Mast
 21-Morgan Shepherd
 10-Ricky Rudd
 5-Terry Labonte
 11-Bill Elliott
 6-Mark Martin
 32-Dick Trickle
 31-Ward Burton, 1 lap down
 15-Lake Speed, 1 lap down

Failed to qualify: 02-Brad Noffsinger, 52-Brad Teague, 84-Norm Benning

Dale Earnhardt clinched his 7th and final NASCAR Winston Cup Championship with 2 races to go, tying him with Richard Petty for most championships of all time. In the Bob Latford Winston Cup points system, a driver can clinch the championship with 2 races to go if he has a 370+ point lead over 2nd, and Dale Earnhardt did just that by having a 448-point lead over Rusty Wallace at the end of the race. This would become the 4th and final time in Bob Latford's Winston Cup points system that a driver would clinch the Winston Cup Championship with 2 or more races to go. Earnhardt had already joined Richard Petty and Cale Yarborough when he won the title with 2 races to go in 1987, but as of 2018, the 1994 and 7th championship would make Dale Earnhardt the only driver in NASCAR history to clinch the title twice with 2 races to go. In 1987, his 1st accomplishment, Dale clinched his 3rd championship with 2 races to go by 515 points over Bill Elliott. In 1978, Cale Yarborough clinched his 3rd consecutive Winston Cup Championship with 2 races to go by 396 points over Bobby Allison, but in 1975 however, Richard Petty clinched his 6th championship with 4 races to go because his point lead was 740+ over 2nd. His margin was 827 points over James Hylton. Petty's championship win with 4 races to go is the earliest for a driver to clinch a championship in NASCAR history. Also as of 2021, this feat can never happen again due to several changes in the points system after 2003.
With this 7th championship, Dale Earnhardt ties Richard Petty for most Championships in NASCAR Cup Series history. In 2016, future driver Jimmie Johnson would become the 3rd driver to win 7 championships. 
As of 2021, Dale Earnhardt is the only driver in NASCAR history to win 7 championships under one points system (Richard Petty won 7 titles under 5 points systems, and future 7-time champion Jimmie Johnson won 7 titles under 4 points systems).
The race itself came down to a photo finish with Earnhardt prevailing over Rick Mast.

Slick 50 500 

The Slick 50 500 was held October 30 at Phoenix International Raceway. Sterling Marlin won the pole.

Top ten results

 5-Terry Labonte
 6-Mark Martin
 4-Sterling Marlin
 24-Jeff Gordon, 1 lap down
 16-Ted Musgrave, 1 lap down
 42-Kyle Petty, 1 lap down
 10-Ricky Rudd, 1 lap down
 7-Geoff Bodine, 1 lap down
 18-Dale Jarrett, 2 laps down
 17-Darrell Waltrip, 2 laps down

Failed to qualify: 51-Jeff Purvis, 02-Brad Noffsinger, 00-Scott Gaylord, 07-Doug George, 81-Jeff Davis, 90-Joe Heath, 86-Rich Woodland Jr., 92-John Krebs, 22-St. James Davis, 95-Lance Wade, 58-Wayne Jacks

The final 189 laps of the race were all under green flag conditions, causing the unusual gaps among the lead cars.
First time in his career that Terry Labonte won 3 races in a season.
Even though he clinched the championship the week before at Rockingham, Dale Earnhardt would blow an engine at lap 91, causing him to finish 40th.

Hooters 500 

The Hooters 500 was held November 13 at Atlanta Motor Speedway. The No. 77 of Greg Sacks won the pole.

Top ten results

 6-Mark Martin
 3-Dale Earnhardt
 75-Todd Bodine
 15-Lake Speed
 90-Mike Wallace
 21-Morgan Shepherd
 12-Derrike Cope, 1 lap down
 5-Terry Labonte, 2 laps down
 18-Dale Jarrett, 2 laps down
 30-Michael Waltrip, 2 laps down

Failed to qualify: 55-Tim Fedewa, 98-Jeremy Mayfield, 64-Gary Wright, 47-Billy Standridge,
32-Dick Trickle, 45-Rich Bickle, 71-Dave Marcis, 80-Joe Ruttman, 35-Bill Venturini, 53-Brad Teague, 61-Rick Carelli, 34-Bob Brevak, 50-Brian Bonner

Dale Earnhardt would officially win his 7th and final NASCAR Winston Cup championship by 444 points over Mark Martin, the 4th largest point margin in Bob Latford's Winston Cup points system history. The largest point margin in the Winston Cup points system was back in 1975, when Richard Petty won his 6th championship by 722 points over Dave Marcis, the 2nd largest point margin was in 1987, when Earnhardt himself won his 3rd title by 489 points over Bill Elliott, and the 3rd largest point margin was in 1978, when Cale Yarborough won his 3rd consecutive Winston Cup Championship by 474 points over Bobby Allison.
Todd Bodine's best career Winston Cup finish.
Mike Wallace's first top 5 finish in the Cup Series.
Jimmy Means' last start in the Cup Series as an owner, with Gary Bradberry driving. Bradberry would finish 52 laps down in 30th.
Harry Gant's last race in the Cup Series. He would sadly complete only 257 out of 328 laps finishing 33rd due to an oil pan failure.

Final points standings 

(key) Bold - Pole position awarded by time. Italics - Pole position set by owner's points standings. *- Most laps led.

Rookie of the Year 
A record eight drivers declared intentions to run for Maxx Racing Card Rookie of the Year before the 1994 season: brothers, Ward and Jeff Burton, John Andretti, T. W. Taylor, Joe Nemechek, Steve Grissom, Rick Carelli, and Loy Allen Jr. Taylor and Carelli dropped out early after a series of DNQs, while Billy Standridge joined the rookie of the year race with Johnson-Standridge Racing in March. Mike Wallace and Jeremy Mayfield took part once they secured full-time rides in March as well.    
    
Jeff Burton, driving the No. 8 Ford for Stavola Brothers Racing, was named Rookie of the Year for 1994, posting two top-five finishes. He was followed by fellow Busch Series graduates Grissom and Nemechek, each of whom had three top-ten finishes. Allen, despite three poles, struggled to find consistency and finished far back in the standings, while Mayfield and Andretti showed promise with different rides throughout the season. Mike Wallace (who started the year at Atlanta in March) and Ward Burton were plagued by qualifying troubles all season long. Standridge ran a partial schedule and was not a factor. Rich Bickle declared to run for the award in 1993, but failed to make enough races so he was technically still eligible for the award in 1994. Although, he did not officially declare to run as a rookie for the 1994 season and was deemed ineligible for the award despite making the required number of races.

See also
1994 NASCAR Busch Series
1994–95 NASCAR SuperTruck Series exhibition races

References

External links 
Winston Cup Standings and Statistics for 1994

 
NASCAR Cup Series seasons
1994 in American sports
NASCAR Winston Cup Series